The Boynton Woman's Club is a historic woman's club in Boynton Beach, Florida. Their 1925 building, located at 1010 South Federal Highway, was designed by South Florida architect Addison Mizner and constructed as a memorial to Major Nathan Smith Boynton through a $35,000 donation from the founder's family.  The building provided numerous community services throughout its history. Shortly after construction finished, the building was used as a shelter for residents during the 1926 hurricane. It was also utilized by the Red Cross as a USO center throughout World War II for dances and fundraisers. In the 1950s, the Boynton Woman's Club also initiated the first full-service public library in Boynton Beach, though African American residents were not allowed in the Woman's Club during this time.  In 1961, the city purchased a residential building at 116 S. Seacrest Boulevard to serve as the municipal library, officially moving the collections out of the Woman's Club building. 

On April 26, 1979, the 1925 building was added to the U.S. National Register of Historic Places and underwent a significant renovation in 1986, funded, in part, by the Mizner Foundation. This renovation repaired and/or replaced the roof, downstairs flooring, air conditioning system, and plumbing, as well as installed an elevator.  The building was sold to the Boynton Beach Community Redevelopment Agency (CRA) in 2017 but was officially transferred to the CRA in 2021. In the interim, the CRA led several renovation efforts, most notably “substantial work on a roof damaged by Hurricane Irma.”

See also
List of Registered Historic Woman's Clubhouses in Florida

References

External links

 Palm Beach County listings at National Register of Historic Places
 Florida's Office of Cultural and Historical Programs
 Palm Beach County listings
 Palm Beach County markers
 Boynton Beach Woman's Club

National Register of Historic Places in Palm Beach County, Florida
Women's clubs in Florida
Women's club buildings in Florida
Boynton Beach, Florida